Filemón Primitivo Arcos Suárez Peredo (born 10 June 1945) is a Mexican musician and politician affiliated with the Institutional Revolutionary Party. As of 2014 he served as Deputy of the LIX Legislature of the Mexican Congress as a plurinominal representative.

References

1945 births
Living people
Politicians from Veracruz
Mexican musicians
Members of the Chamber of Deputies (Mexico)
Institutional Revolutionary Party politicians
Deputies of the LIX Legislature of Mexico